G. R. Herberger Inc. is a department store chain founded in 1927 with locations throughout the Midwestern United States. The chain was sold in the late 1990s amid growing consolidation in the department store industry, while continuing to operate as a separate nameplate and later sharing a corporate division headquartered in Milwaukee, Wisconsin, with Carson's, Bergner's and other regional chains by the close of the century. The company's parent company Bon-Ton filed for bankruptcy in 2018 and liquidated.

History 

Herberger's began in Osakis, Minnesota, when G.R. "Bob" Herberger opened his first store in 1927. Herberger's was incorporated for the purpose of acquiring additional stores and expanding into other communities in 1943. By 1972, it grew to 11 stores in four states, with its headquarters in downtown St. Cloud, Minnesota. G. R. Herberger's, Inc., by then an employee-owned company, merged with Proffitt's Inc. in 1997 in stock deal valued at approximately $160 million.

As Proffitt's Inc. evolved into Saks Incorporated with the company's acquisition of Saks Fifth Avenue, Herberger's eventually became part of the corporation's Northern Department Store Group, an assortment of store locations initially acquired by Proffitt's Inc. as Carson Pirie Scott & Company.  On October 31, 2005, Saks announced that it was selling Herberger's and its other Northern Department Store Group stores (Carson Pirie Scott, Bergner's, Boston Store, and Younkers) to Bon-Ton Stores in a $1.1 billion deal; the transaction was completed on March 6, 2006.

Bon-Ton announced on April 17, 2018, that they would be closing doors and began liquidating all 267 stores after two liquidators, Great American Group and Tiger Capital Group, won an auction for the company. The bid was estimated to be worth $775.5 million. This included all remaining Herberger's locations after 91 years of operation. According to national retail reporter Mitch Nolen, stores were closed within 10 to 12 weeks.

According to the Fargo INFORUM newspaper, the Herberger's website has returned online with the text "Herberger's is coming back".  According to the article, this coincides with the last location being closed as of August 31.  The article did not disclose the financing or ownership of the brand or if the retirement liabilities of former employees remains lost after the transfer of assets.

Herberger's was relaunched when CSC Generations purchased Bon Ton, Inc. and their associated brands and customer lists. On October 1, 2018, it was revealed that multiple Herberger's locations would potentially open or reopen around Minnesota, with the first store likely being in Rochester.

Sometime in 2021, CSC Generations sold Herbergers to BrandX, which is planning to relaunch the brand soon.

References

External links 
Official website (Archive)
The Bon-Ton Stores, Inc. investor relations home page

Companies based in Milwaukee
Economy of the Midwestern United States
Economy of the Northeastern United States
Clothing retailers of the United States
Defunct department stores based in Minnesota
Retail companies established in 1927
Retail companies disestablished in 2018
1927 establishments in Minnesota
2018 disestablishments in Minnesota
American companies established in 1927
American companies disestablished in 2018
Companies that filed for Chapter 11 bankruptcy in 2018